The 12″/45 caliber Mark 5 gun was an American naval gun that first entered service in 1906.

Design and development
The /45 caliber Mark 5 naval gun was designed as an incremental improvement upon the preceding American naval gun, the 12"/40 caliber gun Mark 4. As such, it was a very similar weapon, having been lengthened by 5 calibers to allow for improved muzzle velocity, range, and penetrating power. Designed to the specifications of the Bureau of Ordnance, the Mark 5 was constructed at the U.S. Naval Gun Factory in Washington, D.C.

Measurements and Capabilities

Naval Service

The Mark 5 entered service in 1906 and remained the primary battleship gun for all American battleships commissioned before 1912, at which point it was replaced by the 12"/50 caliber Mark 7. All told, the Mark 5 would arm 14 battleships of five different classes, making it the most-used main gun in American battleship history. Despite this distinction, the only Mark 5 guns ever to be fired in anger were actually in Greek, and not American, service. Though during World War I the Mark 5 would cross the Atlantic for duty aboard two of the American battleships serving in the 6th Battle Squadron of the Grand Fleet, it was never fired in any engagement, as no battles were fought with the German High Seas Fleet in 1918.

The five classes armed with the Mark 5 were:

In American service, the Mark 5 remained afloat (albeit in dwindling numbers) until 1930, when the last guns were removed from the Floridas in compliance with the terms of the London Naval Treaty.

Survivor
A Mark 5 Mod 8 gun is displayed at Fort Hamilton in Brooklyn, New York, representative of the general type of coast artillery guns the fort had.

Incident

During the summer of 1916,  blew out her left hand gun in turret No. 2 during target practice. After an investigation of s guns it was discovered that copper deposits from the driving bands on the projectiles had narrowed the bores of the barrel enough that it caused the projectiles to slow down. This problem, known as "copper choke", allowed the pressure in the barrel to increase to dangerous levels. Lapping heads, to remove these deposits, were issued for all guns 12-inch and larger throughout the fleet. The lapping heads were later replaced by wire and pisaba brushes.

Coastal Artillery
Following the signing of the Washington Naval Treaty in 1922, many of the Mark 5 guns in service were removed from sea duty and transferred to the U.S. Army for use as coastal artillery. These guns were not deployed by the US Army, and some were sold to Brazil, where they might still be in use. In Greek service, the guns removed from Lemnos were emplaced on the island of Aegina, where they helped to defend the approaches to the port of Athens.

See also

Weapons of comparable role, performance and era
 305mm/45 Modèle 1906 French equivalent
 BL 12 inch Mk X naval gun British equivalent
 Type 41 12-inch (305 mm) /45 caliber naval gun Japanese equivalent

References

External links

Naval guns of the United States
305 mm artillery
Coastal artillery